The armored marstonia, scientific name Marstonia pachyta, also known as Pyrgulopsis pachyta, is a species of freshwater snail, an aquatic gastropod mollusk in the family Hydrobiidae.

This species is endemic to Alabama, in the United States, where it is found in only two creeks, both in Limestone County. Its natural habitat is rivers. It is threatened by habitat loss.

References

External links 
 http://ecos.fws.gov/speciesProfile/profile/speciesProfile.action?spcode=G03B

Hydrobiidae
Endemic fauna of Alabama
Limestone County, Alabama
Gastropods described in 1977
Taxonomy articles created by Polbot
ESA endangered species